The Sandrock Cliffs are located in Burnett County, Wisconsin.

History
The cliffs are remnants of the retreating Cambrian sea-left deep sandstone which was carved by glacial meltwater, revealing cliffs revered by indigenous people. In 1990, the site was added to the National Register of Historic Places.

References

Natural features on the National Register of Historic Places in Wisconsin
National Register of Historic Places in Burnett County, Wisconsin
Landforms of Burnett County, Wisconsin
Cliffs of the United States